Castle Donington is a market town and civil parish in Leicestershire, England, on the edge of the National Forest and close to East Midlands Airport.

History
The name 'Donington' means 'farm/settlement connected with Dunna'. Another suggestion is that it could means 'farm/settlement at the hill place'.

King's Mill, the nearby crossing on the River Trent, is mentioned in a charter issued by Æthelred the Unready in 1009 regarding the boundaries of Weston-on-Trent. Dunintune or Dunitone is mentioned twice in the Domesday Book of 1086 as having land belonging to Countess Ælfgifu and land assigned to Earl Hugh. It is called Castoldonyngtoin in a duchy of Lancaster warrant of 1484.

In 1278, King Edward I granted a charter for a weekly market and an annual Wakes Fair. The Fair continues in Borough Street for three days each October.

Lace-making was an important industry up until the 1850s, when a sharp decline in the population is recorded. The population did not recover to the same level until a century later when in 1950 over 3,000 people are recorded as living in the village.

Bondgate, Borough Street, and Clapgun Street formed the nucleus of the historic village, with the Castle formerly standing at the eastern end of Borough Street on Castle Hill. It was abandoned and its stone used to build Donington Hall within Donington Park.

In the early 1960s local councils from Derby, Nottingham, and Leicester were seeking a suitable site to build an airport for the region. The former RAF Castle Donington, to the south of the village, was chosen and land purchased in the parishes of Kegworth, Hemington and Lockington to form an enclosed site now forming East Midlands Airport. The airport opened in 1965 and is now the tenth largest airport in the UK, the second-largest in terms of freight and cargo. The airport site is now an important economic center and a major employer in the area.

Castle Donington Power Station was built in 1958 as one of the largest coal-fired power stations in Europe. It was closed in September 1994 and demolished in 1996.

Education
Castle Donington has three primary schools, St Edwards, Foxbridge, and Orchard, the latter serving the majority of the children of the town. Castle Donington College, which welcomed KS4 for the first time in 2017, takes students from ages 11–16 and is the village's only secondary school.

Transport and housing
Castle Donington stands on the former Nottingham to Birmingham trunk road. The town is a mix of the old and new, with modern shops mixed with dignified Georgian and Regency houses. Several timber-framed houses dating from the 17th century and earlier survive along the main road.

The town has no rail station, but East Midlands Parkway opened early in 2008 at Ratcliffe-on-Soar providing links on the Midland Main Line.

In 1868 the Midland Railway opened the Castle Donington Line, which included Castle Donington and Shardlow railway station, on the northern edge of the town. The station was closed to regular passenger traffic in 1930, and closed completely and demolished in 1968. The access driveway still exists but for pedestrians only, and is the start of a footpath to Hemington, running past the site of the old goods yard, now a scrap yard. The railway remains open for substantial flows of freight traffic as an alternative to the route via Derby.

Economy

East Midlands Airport is served by several airlines including flybe, Ryanair, Jet2.Com, Thomson Airways and Thomas Cook Airlines. The express parcels company DHL has a base at the airport. The now-defunct airline flybmi formerly had its head office at Pegasus Business Park on the airport grounds.

Donington Park motor racing circuit is located to the south west of the village.

The site of the former power station has been redeveloped in to a major retail distribution hub and warehousing area. The principal tenant is Marks and Spencer.

Since 2013 Norton Motorcycles has its head office in Donington Hall. BMI (British Midland), an airline, was headquartered in Donington Hall. The airline moved its headquarters to Donington Hall in 1982. The subsidiary bmibaby also had its head office in Donington Hall.

Events
The annual May Bank Holiday Medieval Market takes place in Borough Street and includes local stalls selling various kinds of produce and goods accompanied by dancing and music.

On the second Saturday of every month a farmers market is held at Castle Donington Community Hub in the site of the former public house "The Tudor".

Donington Park was the original venue for the Monsters of Rock festivals through the 1980s and 1990s, and is now the home of the annual Download Festival. It also hosted a Formula One Grand PrixThe European Grand Prixin April 1993, which was won by Ayrton Senna. It was also set to be the home of the British Grand Prix from 2010 for at least 10 years, but the agreement was cancelled due to financial problems.
The circuit also hosts the Donington Grand Prix Collection, the world's largest collection of Formula One and Grand Prix vehicles. Brian Henton, an F1 driver, was born in Castle Donington.

Sport clubs
Castle Donington Town Football Club, who won the Leicestershire County Cup in the 2005–06 season.

Castle Donington Cobras Football Club were winners of the Derbyshire FA Sunday Junior Cup in the 2014–15 season, and 2015–16 season.

Castle Donington Football Club (Charter Standard) Runners up in the North Leicestershire League, Division 1 2014–15 season, currently playing in the Premier League.

Castle Donington Town Cricket Club an English amateur cricket club, situated on the Moira Dale Recreation Ground, east of the town. The history of the club dates back to the late 1800s. They have a 1st XI senior side that compete on Saturdays in the Derbyshire County Cricket League, and a Sunday XI team 'The Dons' that play friendly matches in and around the region.

Castle Donington Rugby Union Football Club

Donington Park

Donington Park is a site near Castle Donington in North West Leicestershire, England.
Originally part of the Donington Hall estate, it is leased by Donington Ventures Leisure Ltd from owner Tom Wheatcroft. Used as a motor racing track, it is also the venue for the Download Festival. Donington Park had a contract to stage the Formula One British Grand Prix for a period of 10 years from 2010 but this was later cancelled due to Donington Park's failing to secure the finances required to upgrade the track.

See also
Castle Donington Methodist Church

References

Civil parishes in Leicestershire
North West Leicestershire District
Villages in Leicestershire